The Huntwing is a British ultralight trike that was designed by John Hunt of Clydach, Monmouthshire. The aircraft is supplied in the form of plans for amateur construction.

Design and development
The Huntwing was designed to comply with the British BCAR Section S microlight category. It was first flown in 1982 and introduced commercially in 1992. It features a cable-braced hang glider-style high-wing, weight-shift controls, a two-seats-in-tandem open cockpit with a cockpit fairing, tricycle landing gear with wheel pants and a single engine in pusher configuration.

The aircraft is made from bolted-together aluminium tubing, with its 75% double surface wing covered in Dacron sailcloth. The BMW R100RS four-stroke motorcycle engine can also be fitted.

The plans wing is built by the amateur-builder and fitted with a Top Flight Sails sail. Alternatively a Mainair Blade wing can be used.

The manufacturer estimates the construction time from the supplied plans as 500 hours.

Operational history
The designers says that 10 sets of plans have been shipped and about 20 aircraft completed and flown.

In May 2015 eleven examples were registered in the United Kingdom with the Civil Aviation Authority.

Specifications (Huntwing 462LC)

References

External links

John Hunt aircraft
1980s British sport aircraft
1980s British ultralight aircraft
Homebuilt aircraft
Single-engined pusher aircraft
Ultralight trikes